Deir al-Adas is a village in southern Syria, administratively  part of the Daraa Governorate. It is situated about 40 kilometers northwest of Daraa. According to the Central Bureau of Statistics (CBS), it had a population of 3,723.

The name literally means "Monastery of the Lentils".

History
In 1838, Deir al-Adas was noted as a village in the el-Jeidur district.

Syrian Civil War

On 10 June 2022, eleven farmworkers were killed after a landmine exploded underneath their car in the village.

See also
Hauran

References

Bibliography

External links
 http://www.discover-syria.com
 Map of town, Google Maps
 Sanameine-map, 19L

Populated places in Al-Sanamayn District